Edward Hansen (30 January 193716 December 2005) was an American film writer, director and editor.

Hansen was born in Minnesota.  He specialized and mostly directed nudies such as the Kitten Natividad films Takin' It Off, Takin' It All Off, Takin' It Off Out West, and The Bikini Carwash Company. He was also the editor of 9½ Weeks and Skeeter. Hansen died in Antioch, California, of bladder cancer, aged 68.

References

External links 
 

1937 births
2005 deaths
Film directors from Minnesota
Deaths from bladder cancer
Deaths from cancer in California